The Blue Tower may be:
 the Blåtårn in Copenhagen
 the Blue Condominium in New York